Aligovska  is a village in Smolyan Municipality, located in the Smolyan Province of southern Bulgaria. It is located 174.91 km from Sofia. As of 2007, the village has a population of 15 people.

References

Villages in Smolyan Province